Shaked (meaning almond) is a surname. Notable people with the surname include:
 Ayelet Shaked (born 1976), Israeli activist and politician
 Emmanuel Shaked (1930–2018), Israeli general
 Gershon Shaked (1929–2006), Austrian-Israeli scholar and critic of Hebrew literature
 Mor Shaked (born 1986), Israeli footballer
 Moshe Shaked (1945–2014), American mathematician and statistician
 Shira Shaked (born 1981), Israeli concert pianist and musician
 Tal Shaked (born 1978), American chess grandmaster
 Uri Shaked (born 1943), Israeli professor of Electrical Engineering at Tel Aviv University
 Ziki Shaked (born 1955), Israeli round-the-world sailor and sailing instructor

See also 
 Mandel
 Mandelbaum

Hebrew-language surnames
Jewish surnames